The Dodge 600 is a mid-size car that was built by Dodge. It was introduced in 1982, as a 1983 model, based on the Chrysler E platform and was discontinued after the 1988 model year. It was Chrysler's answer to the GM A-body, whereas the M-body Dodge Diplomat would compete with full-size cars. It replaced the 400. (Dodge 600 coupes and convertibles were, essentially, rebadged 400s.) Like the preceding 400, it was positioned between the Aries and Diplomat.

Debut
The 600 was intended to be Dodge's answer to the European sedans of the day. Its numerical name and rear-end styling was designed to evoke thoughts of Mercedes-Benz models, however it fell more in line with North American contemporaries such as the Chevrolet Celebrity, Pontiac 6000 and the Ford Fairmont (the 600 actually resembled the Dodge Mirada more than any European car). It debuted as a four-door sedan, available in two trims: Base and ES ("Euro Sport"). Power was provided by Chrysler's 2.2 L 4-cylinder engine, with the Mitsubishi-built 2.6 L 4-cylinder available as an option.

Sales of the 600 nearly doubled in its second year. This was in large part due to the addition of the former 400's coupe and convertible body styles to the 600's range (which continued to stay on the K platform).  Like most midrange-to-upscale K-car derivatives, digital dashboards and the Electronic Voice Alert were options.

ES Turbo
Midway into 1984 Dodge introduced a sporty new "ES Turbo" package for convertibles. It featured Chrysler's new 2.2 L  Turbocharged engine (which also became an option on sedans and coupes) and a special sport-tuned "ES" suspension. The interior came with standard leather seats, digital dashboard, and four-spoke steering wheel (redesigned in 1985). Visual exterior cues differentiate ES models from base convertibles by way of blacked-out trim (replacing much of the chrome), 15-inch "pizza" style aluminum wheels, "ES" decklid badges, Turbo fender badges, and functioning dual hood vents.

Sales of the ES Turbo were initially slow, with only 1786 copies being sold for the 1984 model year. Output increased to 5621 for 1985, then eased to 4759 for 1986, after which the model was discontinued along with all 600 convertibles. Base price for the 1986 ES Turbo convertible was $14,856.

Midlife changes
Several changes were made to the 600 in 1985. The former base and ES trims were dropped, replaced by a new SE trim. This was due in part to the introduction of the Lancer, which would have competed directly with the 600 (the 5-speed manual transmission was no longer offered as well, in an attempt to keep competition between the Lancer and 600 to a minimum). The coupe and convertible remained relatively unchanged except for minor trim and interior changes. The only significant advancement was the replacement of the 2.2 L engine's two-barrel Holley electronic feedback carburetor by an electronic throttle-body fuel injection system.

The sedan's base trim returned in 1986, while all 600s were given new, restyled front and rear fascias (the front in particular adopted the now familiar "crosshair" grille, dropping the Mirada-inspired horizontal slats). The 2.6 L engine was replaced by a modified 2.5 L version of the Chrysler 2.2 L.

End of production
The phase out of the 600 started in 1987 with the coupe and convertible versions being discontinued in that year. Production of the sedan ended in 1988. The 600 was replaced by the 1988 Dodge Dynasty (badged as a Chrysler in Canada, whereas the Canadian successor is the Dodge Spirit).

There were negotiations to build the car in China after production ended. Hongqi imported a couple of 600s and applied a new rear end and Hongqi badging, intending to sell them as the Hongqi CA750F in China. However, Volkswagen's long-term outlook convinced the Chinese otherwise and Hongqi chose to build the Audi 100 instead, albeit fitted with a locally built version of Chrysler's 2.2-liter inline-four.

Production
Production Figures:

References 

600
Front-wheel-drive vehicles
Mid-size cars
Coupés
Convertibles
Sedans
Cars introduced in 1982
Cars discontinued in 1988